Ramrod is a 1947 American Western film directed by Andre DeToth and starring Joel McCrea, Veronica Lake, Preston Foster and Don DeFore. This cowboy drama from Hungarian director DeToth was the first of several films based on the stories of Western author Luke Short. DeToth's first Western is often compared to films noir released around the same time. Leading lady Veronica Lake was then married to director DeToth. The supporting cast features Donald Crisp, Charles Ruggles, Lloyd Bridges and Ray Teal.

Plot
Connie Dickason is the strong-willed daughter of a ranch owner who is under the control of powerful local cattleman Frank Ivey, a man her father once wanted Connie to marry. Instead, Connie takes up with a sheep rancher who is run out of town by Ivey, leaving behind a note that he is handing the title of his ranch over to Connie.

The conniving and manipulative Connie persuades ranch hand Dave Nash to be her "ramrod," or ranch foreman. He recruits an old pal, Bill Schell, who bends the law to his own purposes now and then but is fiercely loyal to Dave, to come help him run the ranch and fend off the ruthless Ivey.

Rose Leland is in love with Dave and he feels great affection toward her. Connie seduces both Dave and Bill to do her bidding, however. She even persuades Bill to stampede her own cattle, without Dave's knowledge, just so Ivey will appear guilty to the law. Sheriff Jim Crew goes to arrest Ivey and is shot down in cold blood. Dave is ambushed by a couple of Ivey's men. He kills one of them, Red Cates, but is badly wounded. Bill hides him, but Connie carelessly exposes their hideout. Bill volunteers to distract Ivey and his men while Dave turns to Rose for shelter. Ivey hunts down Bill in the mountains and shoots him in the back.

Dave has had enough. He confronts Ivey in the street, armed with only a shotgun, but beats him to the draw. Connie is delighted. At last, she has her land and her man. Dave, though, wants nothing more to do with her, returning to Rose's arms.

Cast
Joel McCrea as Dave Nash
Veronica Lake as Connie Dickason
Don DeFore as Bill Schell
Donald Crisp as Sheriff Jim Crew
Preston Foster as Frank Ivey
Arleen Whelan as Rose Leland
Charles Ruggles as Ben Dickason
Lloyd Bridges as Red Cates
Nestor Paiva as Curley (Circle 66 hand)
Ray Teal as Ed Burma
Houseley Stevenson as George Smedley
Robert Wood as Link Thomas
Ian MacDonald as Walt Shipley
Wally Cassell as Virg Lea
Sarah Padden as Mrs. Parks
Trevor Bardette as Bailey (uncredited)

Production
It was the first film from the independent production company Enterprise and was Lake's first movie as a star outside Paramount. Per the AFI Catalog of Feature Films, production took place from late May to early August 1946. Shooting took place in Zion National Park and Grafton, Utah.

Reception

Critical
The film received a positive review from The New York Times, which said in summary "the director, scenarists and cast, many of whom are no strangers to this sort of emoting, have pitched in with him to make this horse opera a pleasant variation on a venerable theme."

Diabolique magazine says "the movie is a bit out of kilter – you have more sympathy for Lake, who has more at stake than McCrea, who is just a hired hand" and that "Ramrod isn’t perfect but it is interesting, and it’s fun to see Lake in a Western."

Box Office
According to Variety the film earned $2 million, with a negative cost of $1.5 million. This made it one of the more successful films from the short-lived Enterprise Productions.

References

External links
 
 
 
Review of film at Variety

1947 films
1947 Western (genre) films
American Western (genre) films
United Artists films
Films directed by Andre DeToth
Films scored by Adolph Deutsch
Films shot in Utah
American black-and-white films
1940s English-language films
1940s American films